Eko Purjianto (born on 1 February 1976) is a retired Indonesian footballer and manager. He played as a defender. Besides Indonesia, he has played in Italy.

International career
In 1999 Eko's international career began. He finished his international career on 27 May 2001 against China in the 2002 FIFA World Cup qualification.

International goals
|}

Honours

Manager
Persis Solo
 Liga 2: 2021

References

1976 births
Association football defenders
Living people
Indonesian footballers
Indonesia international footballers
Indonesian Premier Division players
Pelita Jaya FC players
Persema Malang players
PSIS Semarang players
PSPS Pekanbaru players
Southeast Asian Games bronze medalists for Indonesia
Southeast Asian Games medalists in football
Competitors at the 1999 Southeast Asian Games
Bali United F.C. managers
Indonesian football managers
People from Semarang
Sportspeople from Central Java